Donald Packer (born 29 August 1948) is a Canadian water polo player. He competed in the men's tournament at the 1972 Summer Olympics.

References

1948 births
Living people
Canadian male water polo players
Olympic water polo players of Canada
Water polo players at the 1972 Summer Olympics
Sportspeople from Vancouver